Pseudocophotis is a genus of agamid lizards from Southeast Asia.

Species
There are two species in genus Pseudocophotis:
Pseudocophotis kontumensis  
Pseudocophotis sumatrana

References

Pseudocophotis
Reptiles of Southeast Asia
Lizard genera